SM Town Live World Tour III was the 2012–13 worldwide live concert tour by SM Town. The tour commenced with one show in Anaheim, California on May 20, 2012 and continued in Hsinchu, Tokyo, Seoul, Jakarta, Singapore and Bangkok.

Background 
SM Town is the name for the artists under Korean record label SM Entertainment. Each year the company organizes their artists to come together and perform on a four to six hours long concert that tours around the world. The concert takes approximately 96 hours to set up, with equipment coming from multiple countries across Asia & the US including South Korea, Taiwan, Japan, Indonesia, Thailand and Singapore. The show's total production value is estimated at USD$5 million, with half being spent on pyrotechnics and staging alone.

Concerts 
The LA concert on 20 May 2012 was attended by Korean American actress Arden Cho, music producer Quincy Jones, who also attended the after party, and other music producers and composers, namely The Underdogs, who produced Beyoncé's "Listen" and Chris Brown's "Turn up the Music". It was played to an audience of 12,000.

The concert in Taiwan was played to an audience of 30,000 and lasted for more than four hours with over 50 songs by BoA, Kangta, TVXQ, Super Junior, Girls' Generation, Shinee, f(x), Exo, Zhang Li Yin; and sub-groups Super Junior-M and Girls' Generation-TTS. The artists were greeted by over 1,000 fans when they flew into Taiwan Taoyuan International Airport on the Friday prior to the concert. The two concerts held at the Tokyo Dome in August attracted an audience of over 100,000 people and the demand outstrip supply by six-to-one. The Tokyo Dome dates will be broadcast in Japan via Fuji TV.

The concert at the Gelora Bung Karno Stadium in Jakarta, Indonesia attracted over 50,000 people, becoming the largest concert ever to be played at the stadium. The artists were greeted by over 3,500 fans when they arrived in Soekarno-Hatta International Airport on 21 September 2012, one day before the concert. Super Junior leader Leeteuk was unable to perform during the concert due to exhaustion and enteritis, for which he made an apology the following day via his Twitter account.
Sulli of f(x) and Minho of SHINee were not at the Seoul Concert as they were filming for their drama, "To the Beautiful You".

Reception 
John Seabrook, a journalist from The New Yorker who attended the concert in Anaheim, California, wrote: "Occasionally, the concert seemed like a giant pep rally. But at its best it elicited primal pop emotions that only a few of the greatest pop artists—the Beach Boys, the early Beatles, Phil Spector’s girl groups—can evoke: the feeling of pure love."

Performers

Set list

Tour dates 

The concert was advertised as SMTOWN Live World Tour III in Los Angeles.
The concert was advertised as SMTOWN Live World Tour III in Taipei.
These concerts were advertised as SMTOWN Live World Tour III in Tokyo Special Edition.

References

External links
 SM Town Official homepage 

12
2012 concert tours
2013 concert tours
K-pop concerts